Now is an EP by Band of Susans, released in 1992 by Restless Records.

Track listing

Personnel 
Adapted from Now liner notes.

Band of Susans
 Anne Husick – electric guitar
 Mark Lonergan – electric guitar
 Robert Poss – electric guitar, vocals, production
 Ron Spitzer – drums
 Susan Stenger – bass guitar, vocals

Production and additional personnel
 Pat Dillon – art direction
 Bryce Goggin – engineering
 Chris Lewis – assistant engineer
 David Perry – photography

Release history

References

External links 
 

1992 EPs
Band of Susans albums
Restless Records EPs
Rough Trade Records EPs
Albums produced by Robert Poss